Adonis Medina Del Rosario (born December 18, 1996) is a Dominican professional baseball pitcher for the Kia Tigers of the KBO League. He previously played in Major League Baseball (MLB) for the Philadelphia Phillies and New York Mets.

Medina signed with the Phillies as an international free agent, in 2014. He made his MLB debut in 2020.

Baseball career

Minor leagues
Medina was born in Santo Domingo, Dominican Republic. He signed with the Philadelphia Phillies as an international free agent in May 2014. Medina made his professional debut that season with the Dominican Summer League Phillies and spent the whole season there, going 2–3 with a 1.37 earned run average (ERA) and 0.987 walks plus hits per inning pitched (WHIP), with 22 strikeouts (SO) in 26.2 innings pitched (IP).

Medina played in 2015 with the Rookie Gulf Coast Phillies. He compiled a 3–2 record, 2.98 ERA, and 1.19 WHIP with 35 SO in 45.1 IP.

In 2016 with the Class A-Short Williamsport Crosscutters Medina had a 5–3 record, 2.92 ERA, and 1.098 WHIP, in 13 starts (GS), and 34 SO in 62.2 IP. He was a 2016 mid-season New York-Penn League All Star.

Before the 2017 season, Baseball Prospectus ranked Medina the 91st-best minor league prospect. He spent 2017 with the Class A Lakewood BlueClaws, In 22 starts, he was 4–9 with a 3.01 ERA (9th in the South Atlantic League), and 133 strikeouts (4th in the league) in 119.2 innings, averaging 10.0 strikeouts per 9 innings pitched.

Before the 2018 season, Baseball Prospectus ranked Medina the 46th-best prospect, Baseball America ranked him the 84th-best prospect, and MLB ranked him the 86th-best prospect. Medina pitched in 2018 for the Class A-Advanced Clearwater Threshers, for whom he was 10-4 with a 4.12 ERA, with 123 strikeouts (3rd in the Florida State League) in 111.1 innings, averaging 9.97 strikeouts per 9 innings pitched. His 10 wins tied for 4th in the league. In July, Medina played in the All-Star Futures Game. He was Pitcher of the Week on both July 22 and August 19.

The Phillies added Medina to their 40-man roster in November 2018. Baseball Prospectus ranked him the 57th-best prospect in baseball, MLB Pipeline named him the 64th-best prospect, and MLB.com ranked him number 77. Baseball America named Medina the 4th-best prospect in the Phillies minor league system.

In 2019, pitching for the Reading Fightin Phils of the Class AA Eastern League, Medina was 7-7 with a 4.94 ERA in 105.2 innings over 22 games (21 starts), and was 2nd in the league with 14 hit batsmen. He was a mid-season Eastern League All Star.

Philadelphia Phillies
On September 20, 2020, Medina made his big league debut, as the Philadelphia Phillies' starting pitcher against the Toronto Blue Jays, at Citizens Bank Park. Medina was charged with the loss, giving up four hits and two earned runs over four innings pitched. He was optioned down, following the game. On December 1, 2021, the Phillies designated Medina for assignment.  The decision on Medina's designation was delayed due to the 2021–22 Major League Baseball lockout, which prompted a freeze on Major League transactions.

New York Mets 
Following the end of the lockout, Medina was claimed off of waivers by the Pittsburgh Pirates, on March 16, 2022. On April 7, 2022, he was designated for assignment and was subsequently traded to the New York Mets in exchange for cash and optioned to the Syracuse Mets of the International League.

On June 5, 2022, he recorded his first career MLB save in the 10th inning of a 5–4 win against the Los Angeles Dodgers. On September 6, Medina was designated for assignment. He elected free agency on November 10, 2022.

Milwaukee Brewers
On December 6, 2022, Medina signed a minor league deal with the Milwaukee Brewers. He was released on December 15.

Kia Tigers
On December 11, 2022, Medina signed a contract with the Kia Tigers of the KBO League.

References

External links

Living people
1996 births
Sportspeople from Santo Domingo
Major League Baseball players from the Dominican Republic
Major League Baseball pitchers
Philadelphia Phillies players
New York Mets players
Dominican Summer League Phillies players
Florida Complex League Phillies players
Williamsport Crosscutters players
Lakewood BlueClaws players
Clearwater Threshers players
Reading Fightin Phils players
Tigres del Licey players
Syracuse Mets players